The 1958 All-Ireland Senior Hurling Championship Final was the 71st All-Ireland Final and the culmination of the 1958 All-Ireland Senior Hurling Championship, an inter-county hurling tournament for the top teams in Ireland. The match was held at Croke Park, Dublin, on 7 September 1958, between Galway and Tipperary. The Connacht men lost to the Munster champions on a score line of 4-9 to 2-5.

Match details

All-Ireland Senior Hurling Championship Final
All-Ireland Senior Hurling Championship Final, 1958
All-Ireland Senior Hurling Championship Final
All-Ireland Senior Hurling Championship Finals
Galway GAA matches
Tipperary GAA matches